Paragorgopis is a genus of picture-winged flies in the family Ulidiidae.

Species
 Paragorgopis argyrata
 Paragorgopis cancellata
 Paragorgopis clathrata
 Paragorgopis discrepans
 Paragorgopis euryale
 Paragorgopis maculata
 Paragorgopis oreas
 Paragorgopis schnusei
 Paragorgopis stapes
 Paragorgopis stheno

References

 
Ulidiidae
Muscomorpha genera